Jean-Claude Lubtchansky (2 December 1930 – 14 October 2020) was a French film editor, documentary and television director.

Career 
In 1976, he produced a documentary film about the Armenian mystic and philosopher George Gurdjieff, which was broadcast in 1978 on TF1. In 1996, he directed , a documentary that follows the anarchist sailor and defender of lost causes and his creator through some of his fascinating journeys. He was also known for making the majority of documentary adaptations of the monographic series "Découvertes Gallimard", three of which were co-produced with the Louvre Museum.

Filmography 
 As director
 1962: Ourane (short film)
 1967: Ici, ailleurs ou dans le métro (short film)
 1967: Dim Dam Dom (some episodes)
 1967: One (Chroniques de France, nº 19)
 1968: Pézenas, un village français (Chroniques de France, nº 30)
 1970: Lumina, pièce pour douze cordes et bande magnétique d'Ivo Malec (episode of Les Grandes répétitions)
 1973: La Rose rouge (episode of Ce que Paris chante)
 1974: Hannah Arendt (episode of Un certain regard)
 1979:  (some episodes)
 1980: Gandhi, apôtre de la non-violence (episode of Les Idées et les hommes)
 1980: 1947 : La première crise de la IVº république
 1980: Louis XI, un seul roi pour la France
 1982: Saint Louis ou La royauté bienfaisante
 1982: Le triange à quatre côtés (episode of De bien étranges affaires)
 1991: The Watch on the Somme (episode of Harvests of Iron)
 1995: Yukio Mishima (episode of Un siècle d'écrivains)
 1995: Cher Père Noël
 1996: Les 13 Vies de Corto Maltese
 1997: La Porte enchantée
 1998: Once Upon a Time in Mesopotamia
 1998: 
 1999: 
 1999: On the Road to Timbuktu: Explorers in Africa
 2000: Les Cités perdues des Mayas
 2000: Champollion: A Scribe for Egypt
 2001: Leonardo da Vinci: The Mind of the Renaissance
 2002: 
 2002: Angkor : la forêt de pierre

 As assistant director
 1958: Cités du soleil
 1958: Le grand œuvre : panorama de l'industrie française

 As editor
 1962: Le Thé à la menthe
 1963: Lord of the Flies
 1964: 
 1964: 4 fois D
 1978: The Last Campaign

 As producer
 1978: Georges Gurdjieff
 1979: Meetings with Remarkable Men (production associate)

References

External links
 

1930 births
2020 deaths
French documentary film directors
French television directors
People from Vincennes
Students of George Gurdjieff